The 2021 World Rugby Sevens Series was the 22nd annual series of rugby sevens tournaments for national men's rugby sevens teams. The Sevens Series has been run by World Rugby since 1999. Due to impacts of the COVID-19 pandemic, only two tournaments were played in the 2021 series instead of the usual ten. The number of teams participating was also reduced from sixteen to twelve at the tournaments, with many of the top teams from the previous series not taking part.

The series was won by South Africa who won both tour events on their way to claiming their fourth World Series title.

Teams
The twelve national men's teams competing in the 2021 series were:

Core teams qualified from the previous season and not competing in 2021 were:
 Argentina, Australia, Fiji, France, Japan, New Zealand and Samoa, who did not travel due to impacts of the COVID-19 pandemic.
 England, Scotland and Wales did not take part, being represented instead by Great Britain.

Tour venues
The official schedule for the 2021 World Rugby Sevens Series was:

On 4 August organisers announced the cancellation of the Hong Kong Sevens for the second year running because of the emerging Covid-19 Delta variant and global travel restrictions.

On 3 September, World Rugby cancelled the Singapore and Cape Town tournaments due to ongoing impacts of the COVID-19 pandemic, and announced that the 2021 Dubai Sevens tournament would no longer be part of the 2021 series but incorporated into the 2021-22 series instead. This reduced the 2021 series to just two events held in Canada.

Standings

Official standings for the 2021 series:

Source: World Rugby

Players

Scoring leaders

Updated: 27 September 2021

Updated: 27 September 2021

See also
 2021 World Rugby Women's Sevens Series
 Rugby sevens at the 2020 Summer Olympics

Notes

References

External links
Official site

 
World Rugby Sevens Series
World Rugby Sevens Series
World Rugby Sevens Series
World Rugby Sevens Series